Abgarm-e Lay Bisheh (also Romanized as Ābgarm-e Lāy Bīsheh; also known as Ābgarm) is a village in Tarom Rural District, in the Central District of Hajjiabad County, Hormozgan Province, Iran. At the 2006 census, its population was 142, in 37 families.

References 

Populated places in Hajjiabad County